Norheim is a village in Karmøy municipality in Rogaland county, Norway.  The village is located along the Karmsundet strait immediately south of the town of Haugesund, just over the municipal border inside Karmøy.  The village lies along the European route E134 highway and on the eastern end of the Karmsund Bridge which connects Norheim (on the mainland) to the island of Karmøy.

The village of Norheim is the site of the Oasen mall, the largest shopping centre in Karmøy. Norheim Church is also located in the village.  The Norheimskogen forest lies south of Norheim with the village of Vormedal on the other side of the forest to the south.

References

Villages in Rogaland
Karmøy